Conus buniatus is a species of sea snail, a marine gastropod mollusk in the family Conidae, the cone snails, cone shells or cones.

These snails are predatory and venomous. They are capable of "stinging" humans.

Description
When fully matured, the size of the shell attains 15 mm.

Distribution
This marine species is found off Southern Madagascar.

References

 Bozzetti L. (2013) Rolaniconus buniatus (Gastropoda: Prosobranchia: Conidae: Puncticuliinae) a new species from southern Madagascar. Malacologia Mostra Mondiale 78: 11.
 Puillandre N., Duda T.F., Meyer C., Olivera B.M. & Bouchet P. (2015). One, four or 100 genera? A new classification of the cone snails. Journal of Molluscan Studies. 81: 1-23

External links
 World Register of Marine Species
 

buniatus
Gastropods described in 2013